Heterogeneous nuclear ribonucleoprotein H is a protein that in humans is encoded by the HNRNPH1 gene.

This gene belongs to the subfamily of ubiquitously expressed heterogeneous nuclear ribonucleoproteins (hnRNPs). The hnRNPs are RNA binding proteins and they complex with heterogeneous nuclear RNA (hnRNA). These proteins are associated with pre-mRNAs in the nucleus and appear to influence pre-mRNA processing and other aspects of mRNA metabolism and transport. While all of the hnRNPs are present in the nucleus, some seem to shuttle between the nucleus and the cytoplasm. The hnRNP proteins have distinct nucleic acid binding properties. The protein encoded by this gene has three repeats of quasi-RRM domains that bind to RNAs. It is very similar to the family member HNRPF. This gene is thought to be potentially involved in hereditary lymphedema type I phenotype.

References

Further reading